Spica parallelangula is a moth in the family Drepanidae. It was described by Sergei Alphéraky in 1893. It is found in the Chinese provinces of Shaanxi, Ningxia, Gansu, Hubei, Hunan, Guangxi, Sichuan, Chongqing and Yunnan and in Myanmar.

References

Moths described in 1893
Thyatirinae